City Music is the fourth studio album by American indie rock musician Kevin Morby, released on June 16, 2017 on Dead Oceans.

Track listing
All songs by Kevin Morby except where noted.
 "Come To Me Now" – 4:50
 "Crybaby" – 3:58
 "1234" – 1:45 (incorporates a portion of "People Who Died", written by Jim Carroll, Brian Linsley, Stephen Linsley, Terrell Winn and Wayne Woods)
 "Aboard My Train" – 3:19
 "Dry Your Eyes" – 4:11
 "City Music" – 6:46
 "Tin Can" – 3:33
 "Caught In My Eye" – 4:49 (Darby Crash)
 "Night Time" – 6:07
 "Pearly Gates" – 3:50
 "Downtown's Lights" – 4:23

References

2017 albums
Kevin Morby albums
Dead Oceans albums
Albums produced by Richard Swift (singer-songwriter)